Laurie’s moss mouse (Pseudohydromys eleanorae) is a species of mouse belonging to the family Muridae that is endemic to Papua New Guinea. It was first described in 2009.

Habitat
The species is found between 2740 and 3050 m in the Bismarck and Hagen mountain ranges of Chimbu Province, Papua New Guinea.

Appearance

Pseudohydromys eleanorae''' is a small rodent with a head and body length of 94 to 103 mm and a tail length of 89 to 92 mm. Its appearance is similar to that of Pseudohydromys murinus'' but there are a number of distinguishing features. The fur is short and dense. The upper and ventral parts are grey. The dorsal parts of the legs are covered in small silver hairs. It has short whiskers and small eyes. The tail is brown with a white tip.

References

External links

Pseudohydromys
Mammals described in 2009
Mammals of Papua New Guinea
Endemic fauna of Papua New Guinea
Rodents of New Guinea